Alistair William Johnston (born October 8, 1998) is a Canadian professional soccer player who plays as a right-back for Scottish Premiership club Celtic and the Canada national team.

Johnston previously played in Major League Soccer for Nashville SC and CF Montréal, and in League1 Ontario for the Vaughan Azzurri.

Early life
Johnston was born in Vancouver to a Canadian father and Northern Irish mother from Newtownards. His family moved to Montreal when he was four, where he began playing soccer with Lakeshore SC. The family again moved to Aurora, Ontario when he was seven. There, he played youth soccer with Aurora FC and Richmond Hill SC.  He made his debut in the Canadian youth program at an under-18 camp in 2015, when he was 16. He played youth soccer with ANB Futbol, and earned a tryout with French club Troyes AC while there. In 2015, he joined Vaughan SC, helping them win the 2015 U-18/U-19 Disney Soccer Showcase, the 2015 OYSL U-18 League title, and the 2016 and 2017 U21 Ontario Cup.

College career
Johnston attended St. John's University for two years, before moving to Wake Forest University in 2018 in search of a bigger challenge both in soccer and academically. He switched positions from central midfield to right-back upon joining Wake Forest.

Club career

Early career
While in college, Johnston returned to Canada to play with League1 Ontario side Vaughan Azzurri from 2015 to 2019 during the college offseason. He played in the 2019 Canadian Championship for Vaughan Azzurri and was sent off in the second leg of the away goals defeat to the HFX Wanderers.

Nashville SC
On January 9, 2020, Johnston was selected 11th overall by Nashville SC in the 2020 MLS SuperDraft. He officially signed with the club on February 25, 2020. Due to the COVID-19 pandemic, which included Nashville withdrawing from the MLS is Back Tournament due to an outbreak amongst the team, his debut was delayed until August 12 against FC Dallas, coming on as a substitute. He made his first start four days later, also against Dallas. He helped the club reach the MLS Playoffs in their debut season, making 18 appearances.

On September 22, 2021, Johnston scored his first MLS goal in a 5–1 victory over Inter Miami. In December 2021, Nashville announced they were exercising Johnston's contract option, keeping him at the club through the 2022 MLS season.

CF Montréal
On December 23, 2021, CF Montréal acquired Johnston from Nashville in exchange for a million dollars in allocation money, with Nashville also retaining a percentage of a transfer fee in a future sale. Montreal confirmed the deal on December 27 and announced Johnston had also signed a new contract taking him through 2023, with options for 2024 and 2025. He made his debut for Montreal on February 23, as a substitute against Liga MX side Santos Laguna in the club's second leg of their 2022 CONCACAF Champions League tie. Johnston scored his first goal for Montreal on May 14, scoring the second goal in a 2-0 victory against Charlotte FC.

Celtic
In December 2022, CF Montréal announced they had transferred Johnston to Scottish Premiership side Celtic, taking effect January 1. He signed a 5-year contract with the Glasgow club. Upon the announcement, Johnston stated at a press conference that former Celtic and current CF Montréal midfielder Victor Wanyama was a major influence on his decision to move to the Bhoys.

Johnston made his debut on January 2 in the Old Firm, starting against Rangers and playing the entire match in a 2–2 draw. He then made his home debut a few days later, starting again in a 2–0 win against Kilmarnock.

International career
Johnston accepted an invitation to the Canadian senior national team camp in January 2021. He made his debut for Canada on March 25, 2021, as a 69th-minute substitute against Bermuda in the first round of 2022 World Cup qualifying, and scored his first goal for Canada in the following match against the Cayman Islands. In June 2021 Johnston was named to the 60-man preliminary squad for the 2021 CONCACAF Gold Cup, and on July 1 he was named to the final squad.

In November 2022, Johnston was called-up to Canada's squad for the 2022 FIFA World Cup, where he played in all three of Canada's matches.

Personal life
His brother is soccer player Malcolm Johnston who was selected in the first round of the 2023 MLS SuperDraft by New York City.

Career statistics

Club

International

International goals

Scores and results list Canada's goal tally first, score column indicates score after each Johnston goal.

Honours 
Celtic

 Scottish League Cup: 2022–23

References

External links
 

1998 births
Living people
Soccer players from Vancouver
Canadian soccer players
Canada men's international soccer players
Canadian people of Northern Ireland descent
Major League Soccer players
Association football defenders
Nashville SC draft picks
Nashville SC players
Wake Forest Demon Deacons men's soccer players
League1 Ontario players
St. John's Red Storm men's soccer players
Canadian expatriate soccer players
Canadian expatriate sportspeople in the United States
Expatriate soccer players in the United States
ANB Futbol players
Vaughan Azzurri players
2021 CONCACAF Gold Cup players
2022 FIFA World Cup players
CF Montréal players
Aurora FC (Canada) players
Lakeshore SC players
Celtic F.C. players